Donald Esme Clayton Calthrop (11 April 1888 – 15 July 1940) was an English stage and film actor.

Born in London, Calthrop was educated at St Paul's School and  made his first stage appearance at eighteen years of age at the Comedy Theatre, London. His first film was The Gay Lord Quex released in 1917. He starred as the title character in the successful musical The Boy in the same year. He then appeared in more than 60 films between 1916 and 1940, including five films directed by Alfred Hitchcock.

He died in Eton, Berkshire from a heart attack while he was filming Major Barbara (1941). According to Ronald Neame in his autobiography, some shots in the final film had a stand-in playing Calthrop's role (from the back) and a piece of dialogue was recorded using an unnamed person who impersonated Calthrop's voice.

He was the nephew of dramatist Dion Boucicault.

Selected filmography

 Altar Chains (1916)
 Masks and Faces (1917) - Lovell
 The Gay Lord Quex (1917) - Valma
 Goodbye (1918) - Capt. Richard Adair
 Nelson (1918) - Horatio Nelson
 Shooting Stars (1928) - Andy Wilkes
 The Flying Squad (1929) - Sederman
 The Clue of the New Pin (1929) - Yeh Ling
 Blackmail (1929) - Tracy
 Atlantic (1929) - Pointer
 Spanish Eyes (1930) - Mascoso 
 The Night Porter (1930) - The Porter
 Song of Soho (1930) - Nobby
 Loose Ends (1930) - Winton Penner
 Juno and the Paycock (1930) - Needle Nugent (uncredited)
 Two Worlds (1930) - Mendel (British Version)
 Murder! (1930) - Ion Stewart
 Almost a Honeymoon (1930) - Charles, the butler
 Elstree Calling (1930) - Himself / Petruchio in Taming of the Shrew
 Cape Forlorn (1931) - Parsons
 Uneasy Virtue (1931) - Burglar
 The Ghost Train (1931) - Saul Hodgkin
 Many Waters (1931) - Compton Hardcastle
 The Bells (1931) - Mathias
 Potiphar's Wife (1931) - Counsel for Defense
 Money for Nothing (1932) - Manager
 Number Seventeen (1932) - Brant - Nora's Escort
 Fires of Fate (1932) - Sir William Royden
 Rome Express (1932) - Mr. Poole
 F.P.1 (1933) - Sunshine, the Photographer
 I Was a Spy (1933) - Cnockhaert
 Early to Bed (1933) - Peschke
 Friday the Thirteenth (1933) - Hugh Nicholls
 This Acting Business (1933) - Milton Stafford
 Sorrell and Son (1933) - Dr. Richard Orange
 It's a Cop (1934) - Charles Murray
 Nine Forty-Five (1934) - Dr. Venables
 Orders Is Orders (1934) - Pavey
 Red Ensign (1934) - Macleod
 The Clairvoyant (1935) - Derelict (uncredited)
 The Divine Spark (1935) - Judge Fumaroli
 Me and Marlborough (1935) - Drunken Yokel
 The Phantom Light (1935) - David Owen
 Man of the Moment (1935) - Godfrey
 Scrooge (1935) - Bob Cratchit
 Broken Blossoms (1936) - Old Chinaman
 The Man Behind the Mask (1936) - Dr. Harold E. Walpole
 The Man Who Changed His Mind (1936) - Clayton / Lord Haslewood
 Fire Over England (1937) - Don Escobal
 Thunder in the City (1937) - Dr. Plumet
 Cafe Colette (1937) - Nick
 Love from a Stranger (1937) - Hobson
 Dreaming Lips (1937) - Philosopher
 Band Waggon (1940) - Hobday
 Let George Do It! (1940) - Frederick Strickland
 Charley's (Big-Hearted) Aunt (1940) - Guide (uncredited)
 Major Barbara (1941) - Peter Shirley

References

External links

 

1888 births
1940 deaths
English male stage actors
English male film actors
English male silent film actors
People from Chelsea, London
Male actors from London
20th-century English male actors
People educated at St Paul's School, London